The Carbondale Aces were an American basketball team based in Carbondale, Pennsylvania, founded in the 1950–1951 season. The team began in the Allentown-Bethlehem area of Pennsylvania and moved to Carbondale in its inaugural campaign. It was a member of the American Basketball League. The team moved to Middletown, Connecticut part-way through the 1951–52 season.

The team was coached by J. Birney Crum first 28 games of its existence (in Allentown). When the franchise moved to Carbondale, Jim Nolan took the reins, and continued in the role through the remainder of the team's two-year existence.

Year-by-year

References

Defunct basketball teams in the United States
Basketball teams in Pennsylvania
American Basketball League (1925–1955) teams
Basketball teams established in 1950
1950 establishments in Pennsylvania
1952 disestablishments in Pennsylvania
Basketball teams disestablished in 1952
Carbondale, Pennsylvania